Ali Hussain may refer to:

 Amir Husain Al-Kurdi, governor of the city of Jeddah
 Ali Hussain (cricketer)
 Ali Hussain (footballer) (born 1985), Emirati footballer
 Ali Hassain Hussain (born 1935), Iraqi Olympic weightlifter